The Honda CB400 Super Four is a CB series  standard motorcycle produced by Honda at the Kumamoto plant from 1992 to the present. The CB400 embodies the typical Universal Japanese Motorcycle produced through the 1970s, updated with modern technology.  To this end, the bike has a naked retro design, paired with a smooth inline-four engine.  Originally a Japan-only bike, it was later also available in SE Asia, and from 2008 in Australia.

Model history 
Unveiled in 1991 at the 29th Tokyo Motor Show as a 400 cc version of the CB1000 Super Four, the motorcycle was introduced in Japan for the 1992 model year, with an engine similar to that of the early CB-1.

1992–1998 
1992: The CB400 Super Four introduced the updated CB-1 engine, tilted backwards to obtain a more erect cylinder bank.  Carburetors changed from down-draft to side-draft type, but still CV.  A more conventional chain drive system replaced the gear cam drive system, setting the red-line at 12,500 rpm.  Wider gear ratios defined the versatility of Honda's intention for the bike.

1994:  Updates to the ignition timing due to adoption of the pent-roof combustion chamber design, the internal structure of the muffler, and the shape of the cam chain links for reduced mechanical noise. The engine mount location was updated for improved handling. A new instrument cluster appeared with the analogue fuel gauge moved to a central location from previously within the tachometer face, a row of indicator LEDs below the clocks, and a hazard light switch.

1995: More cooling fins were added on the lower side portion of the cylinder bank.
A special edition Super Four version R model offered PGM-IG programmed ignition timing along with electronic controlled valve operation, in addition to a headlight cowl, sharper rake angle, lightweight aluminium muffler, stiffer suspension and sintered brake pads.

1996: New front brake discs with reduced tendency to warp, and opposed four-piston calipers for improved initial response.
A special edition Super Four version S model was available with Brembo brakes and Showa suspension.

1997: Updates to the carburetor air funnels, the internal muffler structure, and the Nissin brakes.

1999–2001 
1999: The CB400SF Hyper VTEC introduced major engine improvements through the use of Honda's VTEC system. While having four valves per cylinder, below 6750 rpm one intake and exhaust pair are disabled. This technique improved the engine's low and mid-range power and efficiency, while retaining performance over 6,750 rpm by resuming four valve operation. The light-weight aluminium muffler (previously special edition), 40 mm shorter wheelbase, 10 mm lower engine mount position, and front suspension lifted from the super-sport CBR900RR resulted in improved handling.

2000: Stronger combination switch to deter theft.

2002–2003 
2002: The CB400SF Hyper VTEC Spec II changed the operation of the VTEC system to trigger at 6,300 rpm along with updated ignition timing map. An LCD odometer/trip-meter and clock + fuel gauge were integrated in the speedometer and tachometer faces respectively, as well as adding the HISS ignition security system. Air intake noise was reduced by enhancing the surface rigidity of the air cleaner case. Lighter, smaller oil filter and front brake calipers were lifted from the super-sport CBR900RR. Chipping guards were added to the front fork tubes.

2004–2007 
2004: The CB400SF Hyper VTEC Spec III further changed the operation of the VTEC system to trigger at 6,750 rpm in 6th gear, remaining at 6,300 rpm in gears 1–5, along with further updated ignition timing map. Increased quantity of glass wool in the exhaust pipe collector reduces exhaust noise to 72 dB to comply with government regulations. A new lower seat with single grab rail instead of surface belt, light rear brake caliper and updated front suspension offer better ergonomics. Multi-reflector headlight, LED tail-lights, new fuel tank and rear cowl provide improved safety and styling.

2005: Added analogue pre-load adjustment mechanism for the front suspension and high-density polyurethane material for the seat cushion.  From 2005, the CB400 Super Bol d'Or has been available with a half-fairing in Japan and later in SE Asia as well.

2006: Larger ignition coils supply a more stable spark at lower rpms; clear smoke lenses on the turn indicator lights.

2008–October 2022 
2008: The CB400SF Hyper VTEC Revo introduced Honda's PGM-FI programmed fuel injection and an idle air control valve for improved fuel economy and reliability. The VTEC operation was further refined such that in gears 1–5 four-valve operation engaged at 6,300 rpm for wide open throttle, otherwise at 6,750 rpm, and remaining at 6,750 rpm in 6th gear. Independent cylinder ignition timing map, revised air intake geometry and a larger stainless steel muffler contribute to fuel efficiency. Updated frame rigidity and engine mounting position improved handling. Optional combined ABS uses three-piston sliding calipers on the front brakes instead of the standard four-piston opposed calipers and a larger 256 mm rear brake disc.

2014: Central LCD screen with gear position, fuel consumption, thermometer and heater level for the handle grips (available with the "E Package"), 10-spoke wheels, round mirrors and dual grab rails on a revised rear cowl with LED rear lights and clear lens. Revised frame geometry brought the handlebars 10 mm higher and 7 mm closer to the rider, and also reduced the rise angle of the tail end, both changes resulting in a more upright riding position. Revised half-fairing with LED headlight for the Super Bol d'Or.

Genuine accessories available from Honda include a rear carrier storage box that installs in place of the dual grab rails, a 12V power socket that plugs into the wiring harness, and a central stand.

LED headlight, updated front and rear suspension, right-angle tyre valve stems, and push type helmet lock bracket. Super Bol d'Or is available with ABS only.

Specifications 
All specifications are manufacturer claimed unless otherwise specified.  The motorcycle model designation is printed on a sticker under the seat.

References

External links 

 

CB400SF
Standard motorcycles
Motorcycles introduced in 1992